ISO/IEC JTC 1/SC 38 Cloud Computing and Distributed Platforms is a standardization subcommittee, which is part of the Joint Technical Committee ISO/IEC JTC 1 of the International Organization for Standardization (ISO) and the International Electrotechnical Commission (IEC). 

ISO/IEC JTC 1/SC 38 serves as the focus, proponent, and systems integration entity on Cloud Computing, Distributed Platforms, and the application of these technologies.  ISO/IEC JTC 1/SC 38 provides guidance to JTC 1, IEC, ISO and other entities developing standards in these areas. The Subcommittee is addressing the demand pull from users, especially governments, for standards to assist them in specifying, acquiring and applying Cloud Computing and distribute platform technologies and services.

History
ISO/IEC JTC 1/SC 38 was formed at the October 2009 ISO/IEC JTC 1 Plenary Meeting in Tel Aviv via approval of Resolution 36. The international secretariat of ISO/IEC JTC 1/SC 38 is the American National Standards Institute (ANSI), located in the United States. The first meeting of the subcommittee took place in Beijing, China in May 2010. ISO/IEC JTC 1/SC 38 approved its scope, established three working groups and developed terms of reference for each at this inaugural meeting.

Established to address three related areas of technology - Web Services, Service Oriented Architecture (SOA), and Cloud Computing - ISO/IEC JTC 1/SC 38 was initially titled Distributed Application Platforms and Services (DAPS). Meeting  in Plenary 2 times per year during its first 6 years, with interim electronic and face-to-face meetings of its Working Groups, ISO/IEC JTC 1/SC 38 completed work in Web Services and SOA and increased its focus on Cloud Computing. To reflect this evolution in focus, the JTC 1 2014 Plenary Meeting in Abu Dhabi approved a revised scope and new title for ISO/IEC JTC 1/SC 38, Cloud Computing and Distributed Platforms.

Scope and mission
The scope of ISO/IEC JTC 1/SC 38 is the “Standardization in the area of Cloud Computing and Distributed Platforms”.  This includes:

 Foundational concepts and technologies,
 Operational issues, and
 Interactions among Cloud Computing systems and with other distributed systems

Structure
ISO/IEC JTC 1/SC 38 is made up of two working groups (WGs). Each working group carries out specific tasks in standards development within the field of Cloud Computing and Distributed Platforms, where the focus of each working group is described in the group’s terms of reference. The two active working groups of ISO/IEC JTC 1/SC 38 are:

WG 3 - CLOUD COMPUTING FUNDAMENTALS (CCF)

Terms of Reference:

 Projects related to Cloud Computing Service Agreements
 Projects related to fundamental concepts, terminology and definitions for Cloud Computing
 Projects related to guidance on use of international standards in the development of policies that govern or regulate cloud service providers and cloud services, and policies that govern the use of cloud services in enterprise organizations
 Establish liaisons and collaborate with other entities within JTC 1, SDOs and consortia performing work related to Cloud Computing

WG 5 – DATA IN CLOUD COMPUTING AND RELATED TECHNOLOGIES

Terms of Reference:

 Standardization in the area of data in cloud computing, distributed platforms, connected devices and related technologies
 Establish liaisons and collaborate with other entities within and external to JTC 1 as appropriate

Collaborations
ISO/IEC JTC 1/SC 38 works closely with a number of other JTC 1 subcommittees, including ISO/IEC JTC 1/SC 7, Software and Systems Engineering, and ISO/IEC JTC 1/SC 27, IT Security Techniques. In addition, the subcommittee works with a number of external forums, including the Cloud Security Alliance, Distributed Management Task Force (DMTF), the Open Grid Forum and The Open Group. Together, ISO/IEC JTC 1/SC 38 (specifically WG 3: Cloud Computing) and ITU-T/SG 13 formed Collaborative Teams on Cloud Computing Overview and Vocabulary (CT-CCVOCAB) and Cloud Computing Reference Architecture (CT-CCRA) that developed two standards: ISO/IEC JTC 1 17788 – Cloud Computing Vocabulary and ISO/IEC JTC 1 17789 – Cloud Computing Reference Architecture.

Organizations internal to ISO or IEC that collaborate with or are in liaison to ISO/IEC JTC 1/SC 38 include:

ISO/IEC JTC 1/SC 6, Telecommunications and information exchange between systems
 ISO/IEC JTC 1/SC 7, Software and systems engineering
 ISO/IEC JTC 1/SC 27, Security techniques
 ISO/IEC JTC 1/SC 32, Data management and interchange
 ISO/IEC JTC 1/SC 37, Biometrics
 ISO/IEC JTC 1/SC 39, Sustainability for and by Information Technology
 ISO/IEC JTC 1/SC 40, Service Management and IT Governance
ISO/IEC JTC 1/SC 41, Internet of Things and related technologies
ISO/IEC JTC 1/SC 42, Artificial intelligence

Organizations external to ISO or IEC that collaborate with or are in liaison to ISO/IEC JTC 1/SC 38 include:
 Cloud security alliance (CSA)
 Distributed Management Task Force (DMTF)
 IEEE Computer Society
 Latino American Institute for Quality Assurance (INLAC)
 ITU‐T Study Group 13
 ITU‐T Study Group 17
 Organization for the Advancement of Structured Information Standards (OASIS)
 Open Grid Forum (OGF)
 Storage Networking Industry (SNIA)

Member countries
Countries pay a fee to ISO to be members of subcommittees.

The 29 "P" (participating) members of ISO/IEC JTC 1/SC 38 are: Australia, Austria, Belgium, Brazil, Canada, China, Denmark, Finland, France, Germany, India, Ireland, Israel, Italy, Japan, Republic of Korea, Luxembourg, Netherlands, Poland, Portugal, Russian Federation, Singapore, Slovakia, South Africa, Spain, Sweden, Switzerland, United Kingdom, and United States of America.

The 8 "O" (observing) members of ISO/IEC JTC 1/SC 38 are: Argentina, Bosnia and Herzegovina, Czech Republic, Hong Kong, New Zealand, Norway, Serbia, and Uruguay.

Standards
As of 2019, ISO/IEC JTC 1/SC 38 has 15 published standards. Some standards related to the work in ISO/IEC JTC 1/SC 38 include:

See also
 ISO/IEC JTC 1
 List of ISO standards
 American National Standards Institute
 International Organization for Standardization
 International Electrotechnical Commission

References

External links 
 ISO/IEC JTC 1/SC 38 page at ISO

038
